Aishwarya is an Indian given name. Aishwarya may also refer to:

 Aishwarya (film), a 2006 Italian film directed by Indrajit Lankesh
 Aishwarya, an oil field in Rajasthan